
AD 36 (XXXVI) was a leap year starting on Sunday (link will display the full calendar) of the Julian calendar. At the time, it was known as the Year of the Consulship of Allenius and Plautius (or, less frequently, year 789 Ab urbe condita). The denomination AD 36 for this year has been used since the early medieval period, when the Anno Domini calendar era became the prevalent method in Europe for naming years.

Events

By place

China 
 December 25 – Wu Han commands the forces of Emperor Guang Wu of the Eastern Han to conquer the separatist Chengjia Empire, reuniting China.

Roman Empire 
 Pontius Pilate is recalled to Rome, after putting down a Samaritan uprising.
 Lucius Vitellius defeats Artabanus III of Parthia in support of another claimant to the throne, Tiridates III.
 Herod Antipas suffers major losses in a war with Aretas IV of Nabatea, provoked partly by Antipas' divorce of Aretas' daughter. According to Josephus, Herod's defeat was popularly believed to be divine punishment for his execution of John the Baptist. Emperor Tiberius orders his governor of Syria, Vitellius, to capture or kill Aretas, but he is reluctant to support Herod and abandons his campaign upon Tiberius' death in AD 37.
 Marcellus becomes governor of Judaea and Samaria.

Births 
 Lucius Annius Vinicianus, Roman senator and legatus in the Roman–Parthian War of 58–63.

Deaths 
 December 24 – Gongsun Shu, Chinese emperor of Chengjia 
 Gaius Sulpicius Galba, Roman senator and consul
 Thrasyllus of Mendes, Greek grammarian and astronomer
 Vibulenus Agrippa, Roman nobleman and knight (eques)

References 

0036

als:30er#36